Waverly Lake is a  reservoir located in Morgan County in the U.S. state of Illinois. Located 3 miles northwest of Waverly, it provides recreational opportunities to the Morgan County municipality. The reservoir drains into Apple Creek, a tributary of the Illinois River.

Fish that can be caught here include bluegill, carp, channel catfish, largemouth bass, sucker, white crappie, yellow bass, and yellow bullhead.

References

Waverly
Waverly